Ferdinand von Hompesch zu Bolheim, O.S.I. (9 November 1744 – 12 May 1805) was the 71st Grand Master of the Knights Hospitaller, formally the Order of St. John of Jerusalem, by then better known as the Knights of Malta. He was the first German elected to the office. It was under his rule that the Order lost the island of Malta to France, after ruling there since 1530. This effectively marked the end of their sovereignty over an independent state, dating from the time of the  Crusades.

Life

Early career
Hompesch was born in the village of Bolheim, now part of the town of Zülpich in the Eifel region. He received the baptismal names of Ferdinand Joseph Antoine Herman Louis. He was admitted to the Knights Hospitaller on 10 July 1761, at the age of 14. For this, he needed to obtain a dispensation from the Holy See, serving as a page to the Grand Master Manuel Pinto da Fonseca. By 1768, he had been promoted to the rank of castellan. In 1770, he advanced to the rank of lieutenant, responsible for the inspection of ships and fortifications of the Order. In 1774 he was given responsibility for the island's munitions.

In late 1775, Hompesch was appointed as the Order's ambassador at the court of the Holy Roman Emperor in Vienna, a post he held for the next 25 years. In 1776, he was raised to the rank of Knight Grand Cross, making him a member of the Standing Council of the Order. During this period, he made efforts to re-unite the Protestant Bailiwick of Brandenburg with the Order. These efforts were unsuccessful, largely due to the opposition of the German knights.

In the following years, he received charge of the commandery in Rothenburg (1777), followed by those in Herford (1783), Basel and Dorlisheim (1785), Sulz, Colmar and Mülhausen (1786) as well as Villingen, in the Black Forest (1796). He was appointed Grand Bailiff of the German langue, based in Brandenburg, in 1796.

On 17 July 1797 Hompesch was elected Grand Master, which made him a Prince of the Church. As Grand Master, he raised the towns of Żabbar, Żejtun and Siġġiewi to the status of cities.

Loss of Malta
In 1798, Hompesch was warned that the French fleet that was sailing to Egypt under Napoleon Bonaparte intended to attack Malta as well. He disregarded the warning and took no action to reinforce the island's defenses. On 6 June 1798, the advance squadron of the French fleet reached Malta. One ship was permitted to enter the harbour for repairs. On 9 June the main fleet arrived. 

The French commander Napoleon had a force of 29,000 men against Hompesch's 7,000. Bonaparte demanded free entrance to the harbour for the entire fleet with the rationale being to gain water provisions. Hompesch replied that only two ships at a time could do so. Napoleon saw it as a provocation and ordered the invasion of the Maltese Islands.

On 10 June, the French fleet began disembarking. The French forces were supported by a local insurrection of Maltese, many of whom wished to get rid of the Knights. The rules of the Order prohibited fighting against fellow Christians and many of the French members of the Order did not want to fight against the French forces. Hompesch capitulated on 11 June.

The following day a treaty was signed by which the Order handed over sovereignty of the island of Malta to the government of the French Directory. In return, the French Republic agreed to "employ all its credit at the Congress of Rastatt to procure a principality for the Grand Master, equivalent to the one he gives up". Hompesch was also promised an annual pension.

Final years
On 18 June 1798, Hompesch left Malta for Trieste, where he established a new headquarters for the Order. On 12 October he addressed a letter to foreign governments in which he protested against the taking of Malta by the French. He published a second manifesto from Trieste on 23 October. On 6 July 1799 he sent two letters, one to the Holy Roman Emperor Francis II, the other to Emperor Paul I of Russia, in which he abdicated as Grand Master.  

He sent no letter of abdication to the pope as required by canon law, nor did the pope accept his abdication.  He settled in Ljubljana. On 7 May 1801 and again on 20 September 1801, Hompesch declared that his 1799 letters of abdication had been written for him by the government of the Holy Roman Emperor, that he had been forced to sign them, and that therefore his abdication was invalid. In 1804, he moved to Montpellier in France, where he died penniless one year later of asthma. He is buried in the Church of Saint Eulalie in Montpellier.

Notes

Further reading 
 Galea, Michael. Ferdinand von Hompesch, a German Grandmaster in Malta: A Monograph. Malta: Deutsche Gemeinde, 1976. There is an expanded version in German by Joseph A. Ebe, entitled Ferdinand Freiherr von Hompesch, 1744-1805: letzter Grossmeister des Johanniterordens/Malteserordens auf Malta (Paderborn: Melitensia, 1985).
 Hompesch and Malta: A New Evaluation, edited by Maurice Eminyan. San Gwann, Malta: Enterprises Group, 1999. .
 Ferdinand von Hompesch, der letzte Grossmeister auf Malta: Ausstellung im Maltesermuseum Mailberg. Mailberg: Arbeitsgemeinschaft Maltesermuseum Mailberg, 1985.
 Pierredon, Michel de. Histoire politique de l'Ordre souverain de Saint-Jean de Jérusalem (Ordre de Malte) de 1789 a 1955. 2eme ed. Paris: Scaldis, 1956-1963.

External links 
 Bibliography
 Portraits of Grandmaster Fra Ferdinand Hompesch
 Coins of Grandmaster Ferdinand Hompesch

1744 births
1805 deaths
People from the Electorate of Cologne
Grand Masters of the Knights Hospitaller
Knights of Malta
Deaths from asthma
Burials in Occitania (administrative region)
German Roman Catholics